Sound Of Sophie is the first studio album by British Indian dance-pop singer Sophie Choudry. It was released by Times Music in December 2009.

The album features Mumzy Stranger and Veronica.

Album history
Sophie had previously released 3 remix/covers albums in the past but this is her first solo studio effort. The album is sponsored by Madame- a Western wear apparel brand that she represents as Brand Ambassador.

Track listing
"Manjave [Featuring Mumzy Stranger]" - 4:51
"Pump It Up!" - 4:06
"Soni Soni" - 3:54
"Mohabbat" - 4:20
"If I Can't Have You" - 5:07
"Daddy Cool [Mundiyan Toh Bachke Rehna] [Featuring Mumzy Stranger + Veronica]" - 2:28
"Tu Nahin" - 4:50
"Mohabbat [Remix]" - 4:16
"Manjave [Radio Edit] [Featuring Mumzy Stranger]" - 3:11

References

External links
Channel Sophie

2009 albums
Sophie Choudry albums